John David Alexander (born 1959) is a retired United States Navy vice admiral and naval flight officer who last served as the 29th commander of the United States Third Fleet from September 15, 2017 to September 27, 2019.

A native of Port Neches, Texas, Alexander graduated from the Aviation Officer Candidate School program in December 1982 and was designated a naval flight officer in November 1983. He graduated with a B.S. degree in Mechanical Engineering from Texas Tech University and an M.A. degree in Defense Studies from King’s College of the University of London as well as completing the Royal Naval Staff College Course, Greenwich (UK) and the U.S. Navy Nuclear Propulsion Program.

References

1959 births
Living people
People from Port Neches, Texas
Military personnel from Texas
Texas Tech University alumni
Alumni of King's College London
Graduates of the Royal Naval College, Greenwich
Recipients of the Navy Distinguished Service Medal
Recipients of the Defense Superior Service Medal
Recipients of the Legion of Merit
United States Navy vice admirals
United States Naval Flight Officers